Peder Klykken (29 November 1772 – 22 January 1861) was a Norwegian judge and politician.

Klykken was born at Overhalla in Nord-Trøndelag, Norway.  He served as sheriff at Overhalla 1795–1797. He attended the University of Copenhagen where  he received  a law degree in 1802. He was appointed district stipendiary magistrate (sorenskriver) in Lofoten in May 1809. While stationed there, he was elected to the Norwegian Parliament in 1818, representing the rural constituency Nordlands Amt. 

By 1819 he had left Lofoten. He instead became district stipendiary magistrate in Størdalen og Værdalen (today named Stjørdalen and Verdal). He served as a deputy representative to the Norwegian Parliament during the term 1821–1823, and was elected one final time in 1827, both times representing the rural constituency Nordre Throndhjems Amt (now Nord-Trøndelag).

References

1772 births
1861 deaths
Norwegian jurists
Nordland politicians
Politicians from Nord-Trøndelag
Members of the Storting
University of Copenhagen alumni